No. 1563 Flight RAF (1563 Flt) is an independent flight of the British Royal Air Force (RAF). It operates the Westland Puma HC2 helicopters in Brunei. It previously flew tactical support missions for locally garrisoned British Army units, as well as Belize Defence Force units in Belize. Betweeb 1963 and 1972 it was stationed at RAF Akrotiri flying Westland Whirlwind HAR.10 helicopters on support missions for locally garrisoned British Army and United Nations troops.

No. 1563 (Meteorological) Flight RAF
No. 1563 (Meteorological) Flight RAF was formed in North Africa around December 1942, operating a variety of fixed-wing aircraft on meteorological observation duties, disbanding in May 1946.

No. 1563 (Helicopter) Flight RAF
No. 1563 (Helicopter) Flight RAF was formed at RAF Akrotiri from elements of No. 103 Squadron RAF (103 Sqn) in 1963, flying Bristol Sycamore HAR.14 helicopters, initially, later flying Westland Whirlwind HAR.10s. 1563 (Helicopter) Flt amalgamated with elements of No. 230 Squadron RAF (230 Sqn) on 19 January 1972, to become No. 84 Squadron RAF (84 Sqn), which is currently (2020) still resident at RAF Akrotiri flying the Bell Griffin HAR.2.

No. 1563 (Tactical Support) Flight

British Forces Belize
In 1975, with Guatemala in the grip of a bloody civil war, there was a real fear that Guatemalan forces might invade Belize and at the very least widen their Caribbean coastline. To support the resident British Army garrison, a detachment of four Westland Puma HC.1 helicopters from No. 230 Squadron was sent to Belize international airport at Ladyville in November 1975. There they set about supporting the British Army role of deterring aggression from neighbours of Belize and supporting the jungle training task, as well as providing much needed Search And Rescue cover for the military and civilian population.

Aircraft and crews proceeded to be deployed from No. 33 Squadron at RAF Odiham and No. 230 Squadron generally with a ratio of 3:1 with three of the four aircraft, (needs checking), and crews being provided by No. 33 Squadron and the fourth crew from No. 230 Squadron due to their operational/training tempo in the European theater. Thus, under normal manning, there would be three pilots and three crewmen from No. 33 Squadron and a pilot and crewman from No. 230 Squadron.

Puma helicopters of 1563 Flt were instrumental in securing diplomatic assurances for the future of Belize, after supporting Harrier aircraft of No. 1417 Flight taking part in air shows at La Aurora International Airport, Guatemala City, for the 69th and 70th anniversaries of the Guatemalan Air Force, in 1990 and 1991.

Iraq
To support the Black Watch battle group, (part of UK 4 Armoured Brigade), in eastern Iraq, 1563 (Tactical Support) Flt was re-formed at Basrah International Airport. Flying Puma HC.1 helicopters, the Flight was stood up in 2004 and disbanded again in October 2009.

Brunei 
The flight was re-formed in 2022 to support British Army Jungle Warfare Training School and the Gurkha battalion in Brunei.

See also
List of Royal Air Force aircraft squadrons
List of RAF Regiment units
List of Fleet Air Arm aircraft squadrons
List of Army Air Corps aircraft units
List of Royal Air Force aircraft independent flights
List of RAF Squadron Codes

References
Notes 

Bibliography

 
 

1563 Flt
Military units and formations established in 1941
Military units and formations disestablished in 1993